Saint Francis Catholic Secondary School is one of three Niagara Catholic District School Board secondary schools located in St. Catharines, Ontario. It is part of the Niagara Catholic District School Board.

History
Saint Francis Catholic Secondary School was founded in 1995. The school building was originally built as P.K. Kerwin School, and later, Holy Cross Secondary School. 

P.K. Kerwin School was built on donated land located at 541 Lake Street. It was named in honour of Kerwin in 1967. Initially, it only served students in grades seven and eight. After one year of operation, the school's enrollment greatly increased, and grades nine and ten were later added. In 1984, grade eleven classes were offered under the name of Denis Morris Catholic High School, Kerwin Campus.

In September 1985, the school was renamed as Holy Cross Secondary School. Grade twelve classes were also offered, while grades seven and eight were eliminated. However, in 1993, due to overpopulation, Holy Cross relocated to the nearby former Grantham High School building on Linwell Road.

The former Holy Cross building later became Saint Francis Catholic Secondary School, due to additional increase in student enrollment.

Facilities
Saint Francis' School facilities include: a Chapel, a Cafeteria, a Gymnasium with adjoining weight training and spectator facilities, a Library Information Centre, a Communications Lab with an attached Drama Studio, computer and technology labs, outdoor field and a psychiatric hospital.

Notable alumni 
Abu Kigab - basketball player
Jordan Nolan - NHL hockey player
Riley Sheahan - NHL hockey player

See also
List of high schools in Ontario

References

External links
 Official website

Buildings and structures in St. Catharines
Education in St. Catharines
High schools in the Regional Municipality of Niagara
Catholic secondary schools in Ontario
1995 establishments in Ontario
Educational institutions established in 1995